"Beer Bad" is the fifth episode of the fourth season of the television series Buffy the Vampire Slayer. It is written by Tracey Forbes and directed by David Solomon. It was nominated for an Emmy Award for Outstanding Hairstyling in a Series.

Plot synopsis 
Buffy is still hurting because Parker dumped her after a night together. In a daydream during one of Professor Walsh's classes (pointedly, about the role of the id in Freudian psychology) she saves Parker's life and he swears to do anything to get her back. A dialogue with Willow later shows how much Buffy is not over him yet.

In the real world, Xander gets a job as a bartender with a fake ID, and has to endure the insults from students. He gets to test his empathy skills with none other than Buffy who then proceeds to get drunk on "Black Frost" beer with four college boys. Oz and Willow are in The Bronze together, but he feels a strange connection to the pretty singer Veruca when she gets on the stage with her band Shy.

The next morning, Willow not only has to cope with Veruca having called her a "groupie", but also with Buffy, who seems to be suffering from "Black Frost." That evening when Buffy drinks herself further and further, it is soon revealed why: somebody has a chemical lab set up and is putting more into the beer than just malt. Xander finally sends Buffy home. When her four drinking buddies turn into violent Neanderthals, he finds out that the owner of the pub has been brewing the beer as revenge for 20 years of college kids taunting him. Despite the pub owner explaining that the effects wear off after a day or so, Xander heads off, knowing the damage that could be done in that time. While the boys escape to the streets of Sunnydale, Xander gets Giles to help. They find Buffy drawing cave paintings on her dorm wall saying "Parker bad." Giles and Xander are unable to keep Buffy in her room when she gets a craving for more beer.

Meanwhile, Willow confronts Parker with what she says he has done to Buffy. When he turns his charm on her, she plays along then asks how gullible he thinks she is, before going into a rant about how primitive men are, just when the four Neanderthal students burst into the room. They knock Willow and Parker unconscious and start a fire that rapidly burns out of control. Xander catches up with Buffy and when they see smoke from the Neanderthals' fire, they rush to help. Though afraid of the flames and unable to figure out how to use an extinguisher, Buffy saves Willow and Parker. In the end, Parker thanks Buffy for saving his life, and apologizes just the way she had dreamt — just to get knocked unconscious by Buffy's club. The neanderthal students become subsequently locked in a random van.

Writing and acting 
Willow proves again that she can't be sweet-talked, something first shown in "The Pack".

"Beer Bad" is written with a classic frame structure — Buffy's dream — that emphasizes her development; hitting Parker with a stick qualifies as poetic justice. Producer Doug Petrie says, despite the intensely negative reaction of the fans to seeing Buffy being "battered about by the forces of college" and being treated so callously by Parker, they had to "ride that out" until this episode because "we didn't want her to find her strength immediately in this new setting".

However, the most striking feature of "Beer Bad" is the twin moral: Beer and casual sex are bad. In a BBC interview, Petrie states: "Well, very young people get unlimited access to alcohol and become horrible! We all do it — or most of us do it — and live to regret it, and we wanted to explore that."

In an interview, David Solomon revealed doubts he and Whedon had about the quality of the episode: "The fourth season's Beer Bad wasn't everyone's cup of tea, especially with Buffy fans. Solomon had some doubts about this episode but it turned out to be better than he expected. "Joss wasn't entirely pleased with this story," he says. "He came into my office at the last minute with the script and said to me, 'I tried to make it better but all I did was make it funnier.' I took that to mean, 'We're not exactly sure what this is supposed to be about so just enjoy yourself.' So I actually had a ball doing it. It was a laugh to watch frat boys turn into cavemen and have Buffy affected by the same thing that was affecting them. We just let everyone go 'crazy' and nothing all bad came out of it."

While "Beer Bad" is often called one of the worst episodes by fans and critics, Whedon has a different perspective on the episode: "It's interesting, every single episode contains an attempt to do something real, and contains at least one or two lines that crack me up, or one or two moments that genuinely shock me. I know there are ones that are not favorites among fans. And there are definitely ones where I scratch my head and go, "You know, this seemed a great idea on paper." But I never actually singled one out and went, "Here's a total failure." .... "Everyone always talks about the Frankenstein one, but I think it has some beautiful stuff in it. And I think the same thing about "Beer Bad," where Buffy goes all cave man. A lot of people groan at that one, but I think it has some lovely stuff in it."

Reception
A BBC reviewer complained about its "American puritanism"
and Slayage criticized writer Tracey Forbes for delivering a trite and obvious message in a series containing "such an abundant feminist subtext".
However, Todd Hertz of Christianity Today used this episode of an example of the show's honest portrayal of consequences. The episode remains the lowest rated of the series on film and television aggregation site IMDb.

Controversy 

This plot was written with the plan to take advantage of funds from the Office of National Drug Control Policy available to shows that promoted an anti-drug message.
Funding was rejected for the episode because "[d]rugs were an issue, but ... [it] was otherworldly nonsense, very abstract and not like real-life kids taking drugs. Viewers wouldn't make the link to [the ONDCP's] message."

References

External links 

 
 "Beer Bad" at BuffyGuide.com

Buffy the Vampire Slayer (season 4) episodes
1999 American television episodes
Television episodes about alcohol abuse
Prehistoric people in popular culture